Demai is a Halakhic term meaning "doubtful". The demai status applies to agricultural produce acquired from common people (am ha'aretz) who are suspected of not correctly separating tithes according to Jewish law. As a result, one who acquires demai produce must separate some of the tithes himself, in case this was not done earlier.

Etymology

The etymology of the word "demai" is uncertain, and already in the time of the Talmud may not have been known.
Opinions concerning the word's etymology include:
 The Jerusalem Talmud connects it to the root d-m-y, meaning "perhaps" as in "perhaps he prepared it [the tithe], perhaps he did not prepare it." Its grammatical form may be influenced by opposite term, vadai ("certain").
 According to Maimonides, the Aruch, and Rabbi Obadiah ben Abraham, the word originates from a contraction of the two Aramaic words  meaning "doubtful" (literally, "what is this?").
 As a corruption of the Hebrew word , "things holy", in this case referring to something which may still contain the elements of "things holy".
 From the Hebrew root דמה ("resemble"), as demai has only the appearance of properly tithed produce.
 From the Greek word δῆμος (demos, "people"), as this produce originates with the common people (am ha'aretz).

Background

Jewish law requires several gifts to be separated from agricultural produce grown in the Land of Israel before it may be consumed. First, the heave offering (terumah or terumah gedolah) is separated and given to priests. Then, the first tithe (maaser rishon, 10% of the produce) is separated and given to Levites. The Levites must then separate 10% of their tithe (about 1% of the original produce) and give it to priests (terumat ma'aser). In addition, the original produce owner must separate a second tithe, known as maaser sheni ("second tithe") or maaser ani ("poor tithe") depending on the year of the shemita cycle. Maaser sheni must be eaten in Jerusalem (or else redeemed with silver which must then be spent on other food to be eaten in Jerusalem), while maaser ani must be given to the poor.

The two forms of terumah could only be eaten by priests, and it was a serious sin for not-priests to consume them. Maaser sheni could only be eaten in Jerusalem, while following the laws of purity. The other tithes (for the Levites and poor) did not have any restrictions on consumption.

Laws of Demai

The rabbis divided owners of land in the Land of Israel into three classes; (1) non-Jews, to whom the Jewish laws about tithes did not apply; (2) the trustworthy Jews ("ne'emanim" or "chaberim"), who reliably kept all the tithing laws; and (3) the common people (am ha'aretz), who was suspected of neglecting these laws. Produce bought from non-Jews was considered as unprepared (as produce from which heave-offering and tithes had not been separated); that bought from trustworthy Jews was "metukkan" (prepared); and that bought from am ha'aretz was "demai".

The rabbis did not trust the am haaretz to separate all the agricultural gifts correctly. According to the rabbis, the common people would reliably separate terumah gedolah, for two reasons: it was not burdensome (as a minimal quantity satisfied the Law), and the sin of neglecting it was considered very serious. However, many of the common people would not separate the tithes, whose quantities were larger and whose punishment less serious.

Thus, the rabbis decreed that produce acquired from the am haaretz (known as demai) must have tithes separated from it, in case this had not been already done. One must separate the first tithe, and separate terumat maaser from it for the priests. The second tithe is also separated from the fruit.

The terumat maaser which was separate must then be given to priests, and the second tithe eaten in Jerusalem. However, it was not necessary to give the addition tithes (once separated) to Levites or the poor: since it is possible that the am haaretz had in fact previously separate the tithes, Levites and poor could not prove they had legal title to the demai tithes. Similarly, various leniencies were applied to the second tithe of demai: for example, it could be redeemed without the addition of one-fifth of its value.

The laws pertaining to Demai-produce only apply to produce grown in the Land of Israel, and to adjacent territories immediately outside the Land of Israel where produce grown in Israel was thought to have been taken.

Certain fruits as being mostly exempt from tithing as Demai produce, owing to their nature of being taken generally from trees that grow in the wild, such as wild figs (Ficus carica), jujubes (Ziziphus spina-christi), hawthorns (Crataegus aronia), sycamore figs (Ficus sycomorus), windfall dates, capers (Capparis spinosa), and, in Judea, the sumach (Rhus coriaria).

History

A rabbinic tradition (cited in Mishnah Sotah, Tosefta Sotah, and the Jerusalem Talmud in Sotah and Ma'aser Sheni) indicates that the institution of demai was in force at the time of the Hasmonean High Priest Yohanan Hyrcanus (135–104 B.C.E.). On the other hand, a Baraita in the Babylonian Talmud (Sotah 48a), describes Yohanan as the person who instituted demai upon discovering that most people only separated the priestly terumah offering and neglected the tithes.

References

 It has the following bibliography:
Z. Frankel, Hodegetica in Mishnam, Leipsic, 1859:
idem, Introductio in Talmud Hierosolymitanum, Breslau. 1870;
Maimonides, Yad, Ma'aser, ix.;
Kohut, Aruch Completum, s.v.

Jewish agrarian laws
Land of Israel laws in Judaism
Tithes in Judaism
Hebrew words and phrases in Jewish law